A Metropolitan Detention Center (MDC) is a United States Federal government detention facility.

Metropolitan Detention Center may also refer to:

 Metropolitan Detention Center, Brooklyn, New York
 Metropolitan Detention Center, Guaynabo, Puerto Rico
 Metropolitan Detention Center, Los Angeles, California

Other prisons, unconnected to the federal MDCs
 Bernalillo County Metropolitan Detention Center, outside Albuquerque, New Mexico